Ansgar (Latinized Ansgarius; Old Norse Ásgeirr) is a 
Germanic given name, composed of the elements ans "god", and  gar  "spear".

Ansgar is the Old High German form of the name. The form Asger was in use in Denmark in the medieval period.
The Old English cognate of the name is Ōsgār (the given name Oscar is however thought to be of Irish origin). The name might come from when the Vikings spread through Ireland.
Modern variants of the name include Norwegian Asgeir, Icelandic Ásgeir, Danish Asger, Eske, Esge, Asgar, Asker.

List of people
Notable people with the given name:

Medieval
 Saint Ansgar, (801 – 865), Archbishop of Hamburg-Bremen who was active in the Christianization of Scandinavia
 Anscar I of Ivrea, (d. 902), Margrave of Ivrea
 Anscar of Spoleto, (d. 940), Duke of Spoleto
 Ansgar the Staller (c. 1025–1068), Anglo-Saxon nobleman

Modern
Ansgar
 Ansgar Beckermann (b. 1945), German philosopher 
 Ansgar Elde (1933 – 2000), Swedish artist
 Ansgar Gabrielsen (b. 1955), Norwegian politician
 Ansgar Knauff (b. 2002), German footballer

Asgeir
Asgeir Almås (born 1948), Norwegian politician
Asgeir Årdal (born 1983), Norwegian cross-country skier
Asgeir Dølplads (born 1932), Norwegian ski jumper
Asgeir Mickelson (born 1969), Norwegian musician, artist, photographer and music reviewer

Ásgeir
Ásgeir Ásgeirsson (1894–1972), second President of Iceland, from 1952 to 1968
Ásgeir Gunnar Ásgeirsson (born 1980), Iceland football (soccer) player 
Ásgeir Elíasson (1949–2007), football (soccer) manager and national coach
Ásgeir Örn Hallgrímsson (born 1984), Icelandic handball player
Ásgeir Helgason (born 1957), Icelandic scientist 
Ásgeir Jónsson, Icelandic economist, teacher and author
Ásgeir Sigurgeirsson, Icelandic sport shooter and Olympian
Ásgeir Sigurvinsson (born 1955), Icelandic football (soccer) player and coach
Ásgeir Trausti (born 1992), Icelandic singer, songwriter, known by his mononym Ásgeir

Asger
See Asger

See also
Kong Asgers Høj, large passage grave on the island of Møn in Denmark
Oslac
Axel
Asbjørn
Åsmund
Astle
Ascari, Italian surname

References

German masculine given names
Scandinavian masculine given names